Drabløs is a Norwegian language habitational surname. Notable people with the name include:
 Edvard Drabløs (1883–1976), Norwegian actor and theatre director
 Thomas Drabløs (born 1984), Norwegian musician and drummer

Norwegian-language surnames
Norwegian toponymic surnames